Apuarema is a municipality in the state of Bahia in the North-East region of Brazil.  Its population in 2020 was 7,302 inhabitants.

See also
List of municipalities in Bahia

References

Municipalities in Bahia